Maluf may refer to:

 Maloof (Arabic:معلوف ), the family surname written as Maalouf (with alternate spellings: Maloof, Malouf, Maluf; Malluf)
 Paulo Maluf, the politician from Brazil.
Ma'luf, genre of art music

See also
Maalouf

ar:معلوف (توضيح)